Martina Hingis and Sania Mirza were the defending champions, but lost in the second round to Margarita Gasparyan and Monica Niculescu.
Bethanie Mattek-Sands and Lucie Šafářová won the title, defeating Tímea Babos and Yaroslava Shvedova in the final, 6–3, 6–4.

Seeds

Draw

Finals

Top half

Bottom half

References
 Main Draw

Miami Open - Doubles
2016 Miami Open
Women in Florida